Goretti Alejandra Zumaya Flores (born 31 May 1997) is a Mexican sports shooter. She competed in the women's 10 metre air rifle event at the 2016 Summer Olympics.

References

External links
 

1997 births
Living people
Mexican female sport shooters
Olympic shooters of Mexico
Shooters at the 2016 Summer Olympics
Pan American Games medalists in shooting
Pan American Games gold medalists for Mexico
Shooters at the 2015 Pan American Games
Medalists at the 2015 Pan American Games
21st-century Mexican women